In Belgium, the motorways are indicated by an A and an E (for European) number. The E numbers are used most often. Roads that are (part of) a ring road around a town or city are mostly indicated by an R number.

Since 1989, all highways are built and maintained by the governments of the three regions (Flanders, Wallonia and Brussels).

For safety on motorways in Belgium, 
 60% of killed travelers did not wear their seat-belt;
 38% of crash are impacted by speed;
 around 30% of accident occur near or on a motorway exit or entry, and 5% of accidents are in a junction;
 19% of drivers were stopped at the time of the accident;
 13% of accidents occur in a work zone.

A1 - A12 (Radial Motorways)  
This first list concerns the motorways that start from the ring of Brussels to other cities and are clockwise: A1 towards the north, A2 towards the north-east, A3 towards the east,  etc.

The motorways A5, A6 and A9 have never been built.

 A1 (E19)
 This motorway links Brussels - Mechelen - Antwerp - to the border of the Netherlands onwards to (Breda)
 Length 68 kilometres long.
 Location only in the Flemish Region
 A2 (E314)
 This motorway links Leuven - Aarschot - Diest - Genk - Maasmechelen- to the border of the Netherlands onwards to (Geleen)
 Length 86 kilometres long.
 Location only in the Flemish Region
 A3 (E40)
 Brussels - Leuven - Liège - Germany (Aachen)
 A4 (E411)
 Brussels - Namur - Arlon - Luxembourg (Luxembourg (city))
 A7 (E19)
 Halle - Nivelles - Mons - France (Valenciennes)  
 A8 (E429 and E42)
 Halle - Tournai - France (Rijsel)  
 A10 (E40)
 Brussels - Aalst - Ghent - Bruges - Ostend
 A12
 Brussels - Boom - Antwerp - Netherlands (Bergen op Zoom)

A11 - A54 (Secondary Motorways) 

 A11 (E34)
 Antwerp - Zelzate
 A13 (E34 and E313)
 Antwerp - Hasselt - Liège
 A14 (E17)
 Antwerp - Sint-Niklaas - Ghent - Kortrijk - France (Rijsel)  
 A15 (E42)
 La Louvière - Charleroi - Namur - Liège
 A16 (E42)
 Mons - Tournai
 A17 (E403)
 Bruges - Kortrijk - Tournai
 A18 (E40)
 Bruges - Veurne - France (Dunkirk)
 A19
 Kortrijk - Ypres
 A21 (E34)
 Antwerp - Turnhout - Netherlands (Eindhoven)  
 A25 (E25)
 Liège - Visé - Netherlands (Maastricht)
 A26 (E25)
 Liège - Bastogne - Neufchâteau
 A27 (E42)
 Battice - Verviers - Malmedy - St. Vith - Germany (Bitburg) 
 A28 (E411)
 Aubange - France (Longwy)
 A54
 Nivelles - Charleroi

A112 - A604 (Local Motorways) 
 A112
 Wilrijk - A12
 A201
 Brussels Airport - Brussels
 A501
 La Louvière - A7
 A503
 Charleroi - Mont-sur-Marchienne
 A601
 A3 - A13 (near Liège, closed)
 A602 (E25)
 A3 - A26 (near Liège)
 A604
 Seraing - A15

Aborted projects 
 A5: Brussels - Charleroi - Philippeville - Couvin - France
 A6: junction A7-A54 - junction A15-R3 (west)
 A9: Anderlecht - Geraardsbergen? - Kortrijk
 A20: Perkpolder - Mons
 A22: Holsbeek - Wavre - Louvain-la-Neuve
 A23: Tilburg (Netherlands) - Aarschot - Namur
 A24: Hasselt - Lommel - Netherlands (Eindhoven) (The road is a national road (N74), although the section between Helchteren and the Dutch border has motorway signs)
 A30: Mons - Maubeuge (France)
 A101: was supposed to connect Ranst - Mechelen
 A102: was supposed to connect Merksem - Wommelgem
 A301: was supposed to connect Bruges - Port of Bruges-Zeebrugge
 A603: Burenville - Coronmeuse
 A605: Cerexhe-Heuseux - Beaufays

Ring roads (R)

Main 
 R0 - Brussels (outer ring)
 R1 - Antwerp (inner ring)
 R2 - Antwerp (outer ring)
 R3 - Charleroi (outer ring)
 R4 - Ghent (outer ring)
 R5 - Mons
 R6 - Mechelen
 R7 - Liège
 R8 - Kortrijk
 R9 - Charleroi (inner ring)

Secondary

Antwerp

 R10 - Antwerp (inner ring)
 R11 - Antwerp (second outer ring)
 R12 - Mechelen (inner ring)
 R13 - Turnhout
 R14 - Geel
 R15 - Herentals
 R16 - Lier
 R18 - Retie

Brabant
Former province of Brabant, corresponds to Flemish Brabant, Walloon Brabant and the Brussels-Capital Region nowadays.

 R20 - Small ring of Brussels
 R21 - Intermediate Ring of Brussels
 R22 - Greater ring or second ring of Brussels
 R23 - Leuven
 R24 - Nivelles
 R25 - Aarschot
 R26 - Diest
 R27 - Tienen

West Flanders

 R30 - Bruges
 R31 - Ostend
 R32 - Roeselare
 R33 - Poperinge
 R34 - Torhout
 R35 - Waregem
 R36 - Kortrijk

East Flanders

 R40 - Ghent (inner ring)
 R41 - Aalst
 R42 - Sint-Niklaas
 R43 - Eeklo

Hainaut

 R50 - Mons (inner ring)
 R51 - Charleroi (inner ring)
 R52 - Tournai
 R53 - Châtelet
 R54 - La Louvière
 R55 - Chimay

Liège

 R61 - Verviers
 R62 - Hannut

Limburg

 R70 - Hasselt (inner ring)
 R71 - Hasselt (outer ring)
 R72 - Tongeren
 R73 - Bree

Link roads (B) 
Prefixed by the letter B from the French word "bretelle".

Antwerp
 B101: A1/E19 - N1 (Mechelen)
 B102: R1 - N70 (Linkeroever, Antwerp)

Brabant 
Former province of Brabant, corresponds to Flemish Brabant, Walloon Brabant and the Brussels-Capital Region nowadays.
 B201: R0 - Érasme/Erasmus
 B202: R0 - Avenue de l'Humanité/Humaniteitslaan
 B202a: R202 - N266

East Flanders 
 B401: A14/E17 - Downtown (Ghent)
 B402: A10/E40 - R4 (Sint-Denijs-Westrem)
 B403: A10/E40 - R4 (Merelbeke)
 B404: A11/E34 - R43 (Eeklo)

Hainaut 
 B505: A7/E19/E42 - R50 (Mons)

Liège 
 B601: A27/E42 - N640 (Tiège, Jalhay)
 B602: A26/E25 - N633 (Tilff, Esneux)

Namur 
 B901: A4/E411 - N90 (Loyers, Namur)

See also
Transport in Belgium
List of controlled-access highway systems
Evolution of motorway construction in European nations

References

External links
 Highways in the Benelux

 
Belgium
Motorways
Motorways